The 1955–56 Scottish Inter-District Championship was a  rugby union competition for Scotland's district teams.

This season saw the third formal Scottish Inter-District Championship.

Glasgow District won the competition with two wins and a draw.

1955-56 League Table

Results

Round 1

South:

Glasgow District:

Round 2

North and Midlands: 

Edinburgh District:

Round 3

North and Midlands: 

South:

Round 4

Glasgow District: 

North and Midlands: 

Edinburgh District: 

South:

Round 5

Glasgow District: 

Edinburgh District:

References

1955–56 in Scottish rugby union
1955-56